Yashwant Dinkar Pendharkar (9 March 1899 – 26 November 1985) was a Marathi poet from Maharashtra, India. He wrote poetry under the pen name Yashwant.

Pendharkar was born on 9 March 1899, in the town of Tarale in Satara District. Before finishing his school education at the City High School of Sangli, he discontinued it out of unfavorable financial circumstances. He moved to Pune to take up clerical jobs to support himself. While working, Pendharkar read Marathi literature widely, and developed a love for reading, especially poetry and also composing his own poetry.

At the 1921 Marathi Sahitya Sammelan in Baroda, Pendharkar met Madhav Julian and Shridhar Ranade, and the three formed a friendship based on common literary interests. The three lived in Pune and started frequently meeting for literary discussions. Soon Gajanan Tryambak Madkholkar, Shankar Kanetkar (poet Girish), and D. L. Gokhale joined the meetings, and the group eventually identified itself as Ravikiran Mandal. (Viththal Dattatreya Ghate later joined the group.)

Ravikiran Mandal popularised Marathi poetry in Maharashtra during approximately 1922-35  through public poetry recitals by member poets. Pendharkar had both a melodious voice and a talent for presenting his recitals very effectively. (Some of the recitals used to be held in Lokamanya Tilak's Gayakwadwada in Pune under the sponsorship of Tilak's son Shridhar.)

In 1940, Maharaja Pratap Singh Gayakwad of the princely state of  Baroda (which was then under British Raj) honored Pendharkar by naming him as Raj Kawi (राजकवि) --state poet. (The previous year, soon after Pratap Singh's accession to the throne following the death of his highly public-spirited grandfather Sayajirao Gayakwad, Pendharkar had composed his epic Kawya Kirit (काव्य-किरीट), which contained a description of the obligations of a princely head of a state  toward the subjects. Pratap Singh turned out to be a hedonistic spendthrift who squandered Baroda state's money.)

Pendharkar, a recipient of the civilian honour of the Padma Bhushan, presided over Marathi Sahitya Sammelan in Mumbai in 1950.

Literary work
Pendharkar wrote poetry with romantic, social, and nationalistic themes. He also wrote some poetry for children (and three prose books.)

The following is a list of collections of Pendharkar's poems and prose writings:

 Yashawantī (1921)
 Tukaram Kamble
 Mahārāshṭra Wīṇājhaṅkār (1922)
 Bhāvamanthan (1930)
 Jaya-Maṅgalā (1931)
 Yashogandha (1935)
 Bandīshāḷā (1939)
 Kāwya Kirīṭ ((काव्य-किरीट)) (1939)
 Yashonidhi (1941)
 Motībāg (Poems for children) (1942)
 Ghāyaḷ (1944)
 Yashogirī (1944)
 Kāntaṇīchẽ Ghar (1945)
 Ojaswinī (1946)
 Yaśhodhan (यशोधन) (1956)
 Pāṇapoī (1956)
 Muthe, Lokamate (मुठे, लोकमाते) (1961)
 Hāpisar (1962)
 Kamaṇḍalu (1962)
 Samartha Rāmdās (1964)
 Chhatrapatī Shiwarāy (1968)
 Raṇadurgā Jhāshīwālī (1977)

References

1899 births
1985 deaths
Marathi-language writers
People from Satara district
Recipients of the Padma Bhushan in literature & education
Presidents of the Akhil Bharatiya Marathi Sahitya Sammelan